22 Bullets is a 2010 French  gangster-action film directed by Richard Berry. It tells a part of the life story of Jacky Imbert, and is based on the novel L'Immortel (2007) by Franz-Olivier Giesbert. Filming began on 23 February 2009 in Marseille, in Avignon in early April 2009, and continued for 8 weeks in Paris.

Plot
Three years ago mafia boss Charly Matteï retired. He left the business to his old friend Tony Zacchia.

He lives a peaceful life , devoted to his wife and two children. His past catches up with him when he is ambushed by an eight-man hit squad in a parking lot and left for dead with 22 bullets in his body. Against all odds, he survives to take revenge on his killers.

On the hunt for the shooters, he is confronted with his criminal past and  threats to his family. He tries to identify those responsible without bloodshed. This "weakness" is exploited, and his friend Karim is murdered by the  people who shot him. Matteï swears revenge and goes on a hunt for the masterminds of the attack. He visits the hit squad during a birthday celebration and announces that he will kill each  of them randomly at a time of his choosing.

Marie Goldman is the policewoman investigating the shooting in the parking lot. Her husband, who was also a policeman, was killed in the service but his killer was never caught. Despite the indifference of her superiors, she would like to clear up the murder of her husband. Towards the end of the movie, in order to save his kidnapped son, a desperate Matteï makes a deal with Goldman, who herself is divided between doing her duty and punishing the murderers of her husband, who she suspects were Zacchia's men. The police get a USB drive containing data incriminating Zacchia in a money fraud and laundering operation. Matteï rescues his son and then finally confronts Tony Zacchia at his home, but Zachia turns the tables and is about to kill Matteï when the police interrupt and arrest both.

In the end, Matteï is released as the cops do not have enough evidence to charge him. Goldman had earlier revealed to Matteï that one of the 8 shooters had missed him on purpose in the shootout at the start of the movie. Matteï figures out that this eighth shooter was his friend and lawyer who had been forced by Zacchia into shooting Matteï. He is forgiven by Matteï and the movie ends with Matteï walking with his family on a beach. His voiceover tells the audience that he had left his past life behind him and all he wanted to do was spend whatever possible time he had left with his family. He also says that he will no more have to look over his shoulder as he is at peace with his past.

Cast 

 Jean Reno - Charly Matteï
 Kad Merad - Tony Zacchia
 Jean-Pierre Darroussin - Martin Beaudinard
 Marina Foïs - Marie Goldman
 Joeystarr - Le pistachier 
 Richard Berry - Aurelio Rampoli
 Venantino Venantini - Padovano
 Claude Gensac - Mme Fontarosa
  - Eva Matteï
  - Anatole Matteï
 Catherine Samie - Stella Matteï
 Moussa Maaskri - Karim
 Guillaume Gouix - The Morvelous jr.

References

External links
 
 
 

2010 films
2010 action drama films
2010 crime drama films
2010 crime action films
Biographical films about French gangsters
Films about child abduction in France
Films about murderers
French films about revenge
Films about violence
Films based on crime novels
Films based on French novels
Films produced by Luc Besson
French crime action films
2010s French-language films
Mafia films
Films directed by Richard Berry
2010s French films